Ivan Matošević (born 27 February 1989) is a Croatian professional footballer.

Club career
Matošević had spells in Austria with Vorwärts Steyr and Wallern.

References

External links
 

1989 births
Living people
Sportspeople from Pula
Association football wingers
Croatian footballers
NK Rovinj players
NK Zadar players
SK Vorwärts Steyr players
FK Sarajevo players
NK Pomorac 1921 players
SV Wallern players
Croatian Football League players
Austrian Landesliga players
First Football League (Croatia) players
Austrian Regionalliga players
Croatian expatriate footballers
Expatriate footballers in Austria
Croatian expatriate sportspeople in Austria
Expatriate footballers in Bosnia and Herzegovina
Croatian expatriate sportspeople in Bosnia and Herzegovina